Cabin Creek may refer to the following places in the United States:

Streams
Cabin Creek (Appomattox River), Virginia
Cabin Creek (Montana)
Cabin Creek (South Dakota)
Cabin Creek (West Virginia)

Other places
Cabin Creek, West Virginia, an unincorporated community
Cabin Creek Historic District, a historic settlement in Kittitas County, Washington
Cabin Creek Ranger Residence and Dormitory, historic buildings in Sequoia National Park, California
Cabin Creek USFS Airport, an airport in Valley County, Idaho

Other uses
Battle of Cabin Creek (disambiguation)